Anthony Ronald Entrican Sinclair   (born March 25, 1944) is a professor emeritus of zoology at the University of British Columbia.

Education and early life
The son of Sir Ronald Ormiston Sinclair, Tony Sinclair spent his early childhood in the African bush in Tanzania, where his love for Africa and animals led him to study for degrees in zoology at Pembroke College, Oxford. For his doctoral dissertation, Sinclair conducted research into the ecology of African Buffalo under Niko Tinbergen at the University of Oxford with supervision from Hugh Lamprey at the Serengeti Research Institute.

Research and career

Sinclair is an ecologist and leading authority on the ecology, population dynamics and community structures of large mammals. His work is of importance for the management and conservation of the environment in Africa, North America and Australia. He is particularly interested in the areas of predator sensitive foraging, predator–prey theory, migration and the regulation of populations.

By conducting long-term research on large mammals in the Mara–Serengeti ecosystem and elsewhere in East Africa, Sinclair showed the ways in which different animal populations are regulated. He has also investigated how plant-eating animals are able to co-exist with each other, even when they have overlapping food sources.

Sinclair and his work are featured prominently in the documentary film, The Serengeti Rules, which was released in 2018.

Awards and honours
In 1996, he was elected a Fellow of the Royal Society of Canada (FRSC) and he was elected a Fellow of the Royal Society (FRS) in 2002.

References

1944 births
Living people
20th-century Canadian zoologists
Fellows of the Royal Society of Canada
Canadian Fellows of the Royal Society
Alumni of the University of Oxford
Academic staff of the University of British Columbia
Place of birth missing (living people)